The Canada women's national soccer team represents Canada in international soccer competitions. They are overseen by the Canadian Soccer Association, the governing body for soccer in Canada.

The team reached international prominence at the 2003 FIFA Women's World Cup, losing in the bronze medal match to the United States. Canada qualified for its first Olympic women's soccer tournament in 2008, making it to the quarterfinals. Canada's most significant achievement has been winning the gold medal at the 2020 Olympics in Tokyo. The team is also two-time CONCACAF Women's Championship winners, and two-time Olympic bronze medallists.

A certain segment of the Canadian women's soccer fans are closely linked to the U-20 team (U-19 prior to 2006), partly due to Canada hosting the inaugural FIFA U-19 Women's World Championship in 2002, a tournament in which the team won silver in front of 47,784 fans at Commonwealth Stadium in Edmonton, Alberta. Canada also hosted the 2015 FIFA Women's World Cup, where they were eliminated in the quarterfinals by England. Canada set the tournament and team record for attendance in the process, with 1,353,506 and 54,027 respectively.

History

The Canada women's team played its first international match on July 7, 1986, a 2–0 away loss to the United States. The team's first major tournament was the 1995 FIFA Women's World Cup in Sweden, where the team achieved one draw and two losses in group play and failed to advance. Its first success in a major tournament was the 2003 FIFA Women's World Cup in the United States, where Canada finished in fourth place, their first time reaching the semifinals of a major global tournament. Canada hosted the 2015 FIFA Women's World Cup for the first time, where they reached the quarterfinals. The Canadian team won the bronze medal at both the 2012 and 2016 Olympics, and its best finish in any major global tournament was its gold medal victory at the 2020 Summer Olympics.

Captain Christine Sinclair has been called the "backbone" of the Canadian national team, earning her 250th cap in 2016, while ranking first worldwide in international goals scored by any player, man or woman. She was named Canada Soccer's female player of the year every year from 2004 to 2014, and has been nominated for FIFA's Women's World Player of the Year. Despite speculation otherwise, she confirmed in 2016 that she plans to compete in the 2019 Women's World Cup and the 2020 Olympics. She also added prior to the 2016 Olympics that "The young players coming into this Olympic squad have brought an energy and passion to our team and they have risen the bar."

Results and fixtures

The following is a list of match results in the last 12 months, as well as any future matches that have been scheduled.

Legend

2022

2023

Head-to-head record
Key

The following table shows Canada's all-time official international record per opponent:

Coaching staff

Current staff

Coaching history

Players

Current squad

 The following players were called up for the 2023 SheBelieves Cup. Caps and goals are current as of February 22, 2022 after the match against .

Recent call-ups
The following players were named to a squad in the last 12 months.

  = Injured
  = Retired
  = No longer eligible
 : Preliminary squad

Individual records

Bold players are still active.

Most capped players

Top goalscorers

Most assists

Most clean sheets (five or more)

Competitive record
 Champions   Runners-up   Third place   Tournament played fully or partially on home soil

FIFA Women's World Cup

*Denotes draws include knockout matches decided via penalty shoot-out.

Summer Olympics

*Denotes draws include knockout matches decided via penalty shoot-out.

CONCACAF W Championship

*Denotes draws include knockout matches decided via penalty shoot-out.

Pan American Games

*Denotes draws include knockout matches decided via penalty shoot-out.

Minor tournaments

Algarve Cup
 2000 Algarve Cup Fifth place
 2001 Algarve Cup Fourth place
 2002 Algarve Cup Eighth place
 2003 Algarve Cup Seventh place
 2016 Algarve Cup  Champions
 2017 Algarve Cup  Runners-up
 2018 Algarve Cup Fifth place
 2019 Algarve Cup  Third place

Cyprus Women's Cup
 2008 Cyprus Cup  Champions
 2009 Cyprus Cup  Runners-up
 2010 Cyprus Cup  Champions
 2011 Cyprus Cup  Champions
 2012 Cyprus Cup  Runners-up
 2013 Cyprus Cup  Runners-up
 2014 Cyprus Cup Fifth place
 2015 Cyprus Cup  Runners-up

Four Nations Tournament
 2004 Fourth place
 2008  Third place
 2011  Runners-up
 2013  Runners-up
 2015  Champions
International Women's Football Tournament
 2010  Champions
 2013  Third Place
 2015  Runners-up
Yongchuan International Tournament
 2019  Third place

SheBelieves Cup
The SheBelieves Cup is a global invitational tournament for national teams in women's soccer hosted in the United States.

Arnold Clark Cup
The Arnold Clark Cup is a global invitational tournament for national teams in women's soccer hosted in England.

FIFA World Ranking

Last update was on July 12, 20221
Source:

 Best Ranking   Worst Ranking   Best Mover   Worst Mover

Honours 
Major competitions
Olympic Games
  Gold medalist (1): 2020
  Bronze medalist (2): 2012, 2016
 CONCACAF Women's Championship
  Champion (2): 1998, 2010

See also

 Canada women's national under-17 soccer team
 Canada women's national under-20 soccer team
 Canada men's national soccer team
 Women's soccer in Canada
 Soccer in Canada
 The Voyageurs
 List of Canada women's international soccer players

References

External links

 
 FIFA profile
 Canada Soccer records and results 2022

 
North American women's national association football teams
Canadian Soccer Association